"Chocolate City" is a song by the funk band Parliament, the lead track of their 1975 album of the same name. It was also released as a two-part single, the first from the album.

Background
The song's largely spoken vocals (delivered by George Clinton) express pride in "Chocolate Cities", that is, cities with a majority black population. The song also reflects on the solidarity of African-American society at the time. The singer playfully hypothesizes what it would be like if there were an African American in the White House, and assigns the following people to positions in government:

Muhammad Ali - President of the United States
James Brown - Vice President of the United States
Reverend Ike - Secretary of the Treasury
Richard Pryor - Minister of Education (fictional - the United States Department of Education was not created until 1979, and was headed by a Secretary)
Stevie Wonder - Secretary of Fine Arts (fictional; the closest existing agency is the National Endowment for the Arts)
Aretha Franklin - First Lady

Clinton's lyrics referred to Chocolate City as "my piece of the rock", as opposed to the "40 acres and a mule" that slaves were promised after the Civil War. The song closes with phrase "Just got New York, I'm told."

"Chocolate" cities in the song
Washington, D.C. - Clinton says that the real chocolate city is the capital
Newark, New Jersey
Gary, Indiana
Los Angeles, California
Atlanta, Georgia
New York, New York

Chart performance

References

Parliament (band) songs
1975 singles
Songs written by George Clinton (funk musician)
Songs written by Bootsy Collins
Songs written by Bernie Worrell
Casablanca Records singles
1975 songs
Songs about cities in the United States
Songs about black people